FT Magazine is a supplement to the weekend edition of the Financial Times newspaper.

History and profile
FT Magazine was founded in 2003. John Lloyd was the first editor of the magazine. It is published on Saturdays and covers world events, politics and the arts.

It is only included with the UK and Ireland edition of the Financial Times; however, articles from it are also printed in sections of the USA edition of the Financial Times, e.g. the Lunch with the FT.

References

External links
 Official website

2003 establishments in the United Kingdom
Business magazines published in the United Kingdom
Weekly magazines published in the United Kingdom
Financial Times
Magazines established in 2003
Newspaper supplements